Galium sterneri or limestone bedstraw is a plant species of the Rubiaceae. It is native to northern Europe (Denmark, the Faroe Islands, Great Britain, Ireland, Norway and Germany).

References

External links
Online Atlas of the British & Irish Flora, Galium sterneri (Limestone Bedstraw)
British Wild Plant, Galium sterneri   Limestone Bedstraw 
Irish Wildflowers, Limestone Bedstraw, Galium sterneri, Rú beag 
Biopix photo, Galium sterneri

sterneri
Flora of Great Britain
Flora of Denmark
Flora of the Faroe Islands
Flora of Ireland
Flora of Norway
Flora of Germany
Plants described in 1960